Den kære familie is a 1962 Danish comedy film directed by Erik Balling based on a play by Gustav Esmann. It was entered into the 3rd Moscow International Film Festival where cinematographer Jørgen Skov won a Silver Prize for photography.

Cast
 Gunnar Lauring as Skibsreder Jacob Friis
 Lise Ringheim as Elise Randall
 Bjørn Watt-Boolsen as William Randall
 Helle Virkner as Emilie
 Jarl Kulle as Count Claes af Lejonstam
 Ghita Nørby as Ida Friis
 Ole Søltoft as Friis' søn
 Ebbe Langberg as Valdemar Nystrøm
 Henning Moritzen as Alex Maagenhjelm
 Keld Markuslund as von Schildpadde
 Buster Larsen as Ludwig

References

External links
 
 

1962 films
1962 comedy films
Danish comedy films
1960s Danish-language films
Films directed by Erik Balling